Axel Düberg (17 October 1927 – 6 October 2001) was a Swedish film actor. He was born and died in Stockholm, Sweden.

Filmography

References

External links

1927 births
2001 deaths
Swedish male film actors
Male actors from Stockholm
20th-century Swedish male actors